Cubic may refer to:

Science and mathematics
 Cube (algebra), "cubic" measurement
 Cube, a three-dimensional solid object bounded by six square faces, facets or sides, with three meeting at each vertex
 Cubic crystal system, a crystal system where the unit cell is in the shape of a cube
 Cubic function, a polynomial function of degree three
 Cubic equation, a polynomial equation (reducible to ax3 + bx2 + cx + d = 0)
 Cubic form, a homogeneous polynomial of degree 3
 Cubic graph (mathematics - graph theory), a graph where all vertices have degree 3
 Cubic plane curve (mathematics), a plane algebraic curve C defined by a cubic equation
 Cubic reciprocity (mathematics - number theory), a theorem analogous to quadratic reciprocity
 Cubic surface, an algebraic surface in three-dimensional space
 Cubic zirconia, in geology, a mineral that is widely synthesized for use as a diamond simulacra
 CUBIC, a histology method

Computing
 Cubic IDE, a modular development environment
 CUBIC TCP, a TCP congestion-avoidance strategy

Media
 Cubic (film), a 2002 science-fiction film also known as Equilibrium
 Cubic (TV series), a 2014 Thai soap opera

Other
 Cubic Corporation, an American company that provides transportation and defense systems
 Cubic Transportation Systems, a division of Cubic Corporation
 Cubic (river), a tributary of the Ier in northwestern Romania

See also
 
 
 Cube (disambiguation)
 Cubicle, a small area set off by walls for special use, such as a place to work, to shower, or with a toilet
 Quadratic, relating to degree 2, as next lower below cubic
 Quartic, relating to degree 4, as next higher above cubic

Mathematics disambiguation pages